Batchuluuny Anar (born 29 December 1985) is a Mongolian international footballer. He made his first appearance for the Mongolia national football team in 2007.

References

1985 births
Mongolian footballers
Mongolia international footballers
Erchim players
Living people

Association football midfielders
Mongolian National Premier League players